Oxygenation may refer to:

 Oxygenation (environmental), a measurement of dissolved oxygen concentration in soil or water
 Oxygen saturation (medicine), the process by which concentrations of oxygen increase within a tissue
 Water oxygenation, the process of increasing the oxygen saturation of the water
 Dioxygen complex, the chemical details of how metals bind oxygen
 Great Oxygenation Event, an ancient event that led to the rise of oxygen within our atmosphere

See also
 Oxygenase, an enzyme that oxidizes a substrate by transferring the oxygen from molecular oxygen O2 (as in air) to it
Oxidation